The following lists events that happened during 1792 in Australia.

Leaders
Monarch - George III
Governor of New South Wales – Captain Arthur Phillip
Lieutenant-Governor of Norfolk Island – Philip Gidley King
 Commanding officer of the New South Wales Corps – Francis Grose

Events
 14 February – Sydney's first retail shop opens.
 23 April – The French d'Entrecasteaux expedition, consisting of frigates Recherche and Espérance, land at Recherche Bay, Tasmania to rewater and rest.
 28 May – d'Entrecasteaux expedition leaves Tasmania and sails into the Pacific to search for La Pérouse.
 14 July – The Home Secretary authorises Phillip to make land grants to civil and military officers.
 1 November – The Philadelphia becomes the first foreign trading vessel to visit Sydney.
 December – d'Entrecasteaux expedition makes land near Cape Leeuwin and explores south coast of Western Australia.
 10 December – With the colony beginning to flourish, Phillip is granted leave and permitted to return to England. He leaves on the Atlantic, taking Bennelong and Yemmerrawanne with him, and retires to a quiet life in Bath. While the British government decides on a replacement, Francis Grose (the commanding officer of the New South Wales Corps) takes control as Acting Governor.
11 December – Francis Grose officially takes up his role as Administrator 
24 December – The American ship Hope arrives in Sydney; Grose is forced to buy alcohol to obtain other cargo.

Births
 9 March – Robert Johnston 
 16 June – Major Sir Thomas Livingston Mitchell surveyor and explorer.
 20 October – John Pascoe Fawkner

References

 
Australia
Years of the 18th century in Australia